Clem Portman (March 1, 1905 – October 21, 1992) was an American sound engineer. He was nominated for an Academy Award in the category Sound Recording for the film Gaily, Gaily. He worked on over 200 films between 1930 and 1970.

Selected filmography
 Gaily, Gaily (1969)

References

External links

1905 births
1992 deaths
American audio engineers
People from Cook County, Illinois
Engineers from Illinois
20th-century American engineers